Kelvin Carruthers (born 3 January 1938) is an Australian former world champion Grand Prix motorcycle road racer and racing team manager. After his motorcycle riding career, he became race team manager for world championship winning riders Kenny Roberts and Eddie Lawson.

Motorcycle racing career
Carruthers, as the son of a motorcycle shop owner, learned how to work on bikes from a young age, started riding at 10, and entered his first race at 12. By the early 1960s he had won the Australian 125 cc, 250 cc, 350 cc and 500 cc National Championships.

In early 1966, he moved to Europe with his family to compete in British and International short-circuit races, including Grand Prix World Championship events riding a Drixton Aermacchi, and for early 1969 season riding bikes for the Aermacchi factory. Halfway through the 1969 season, he was offered a ride with the Benelli factory and won the Isle of Man 250 cc TT race. After the Isle of Man TT, Aermacchi released him from their contract to continue as a factory rider with Benelli and, he went on to win the 1969 FIM 250cc road racing world championship after a tight points battle with Santiago Herrero and Kent Andersson.

After the 1970 Grand Prix season, he accepted an offer from Yamaha to race in America. Yamaha asked him to tutor a young American dirt track racer named Kenny Roberts. In 1973, Carruthers became the manager of Yamaha's American racing team. Under Carruthers’ guidance, Roberts would win the 1973 and 1974 Grand National Championship for Yamaha. When it became apparent that Yamaha didn't have a bike able to compete with the dominant Harley Davidson dirt track team, they decided to send Carruthers and Roberts to Europe to compete in the road racing world championships. With Carruthers tuning the bikes and offering guidance, Roberts went on to win three consecutive world championships in 1978, 1979, and 1980. Carruthers also managed Eddie Lawson to a 500cc World Championship in 1984.

Carruthers went on to work for several Grand Prix teams through to the 1995 season. In 1996, he took a job with the Sea-Doo watercraft factory racing team, helping them win several national and world titles. He returned to motorcycling in 1998 running a Yamaha satellite motocross team.

In 1985, Carruthers was inducted into the Sport Australia Hall of Fame. He was inducted into the AMA Motorcycle Hall of Fame in 1999.

Grand Prix motorcycle racing resultsKel Carruthers Isle of Man TT results. Iomtt.com. Retrieved on 14 July 2014. 
Points system from 1950 to 1968:

Points system from 1969 onwards:

(key) (Races in bold indicate pole position; races in italics indicate fastest lap)

References

External links

 Kel Carruthers Interview at superbikeplanet.com

1938 births
Living people
Motorcycle racers from Sydney
Australian motorcycle racers
125cc World Championship riders
250cc World Championship riders
350cc World Championship riders
500cc World Championship riders
Isle of Man TT riders
Sport Australia Hall of Fame inductees
250cc World Riders' Champions